John O. Hertler (born September 17, 1950, in Ridgewood, Queens) is an American Thoroughbred horse trainer.

He was fifteen years old when he began working for Hall of Fame trainer Phil Johnson with whom he remained for thirteen years. In 1978 he went out on his own, training horses he purchased as well as for others.

John Hertler trained Ballindaggin, who won the inaugural running of the Molson Export Challenge (Woodbine Mile) in 1988 and Slew the Dragon who won the 1988 Hollywood Derby. He has twice won the Ashley T. Cole Handicap in 1999 and 2006. However, he is best known as the trainer of the Eclipse Award winner and Hall of Fame colt, Slew o' Gold.

References
 John Hertler's biography at the NYRA

1950 births
Living people
American horse trainers
American racehorse owners and breeders
Sportspeople from Queens, New York